Almere Pioneers is a Dutch amateur basketball team based in Almere. The team plays in the Promotiedivisie, the Dutch second tier league.

History
The club was founded in 1999 as a professional basketball club named BC Omniworld Almere and participated in the top-tier Eredivisie. The team played its home games in the Topsportcentrum Almere. The 2002–03 season was the best season in Almere's history, as the team reached the Eredivisie finals. In these finals Omniworld lost 0–4 to Amsterdam. In January 2008, the team went bankrupt and was forced to leave the Eredivisie.

A year later, the club changed its name to Almere Pioneers and started playing in the second-tier amateur league Promotiedivisie. In 2013, Pioneers tried to make a comeback to the Eredivisie but failed due to a lack of budget. In 2020, Almere Sailors was established by the Pioneers board. This separate professional club now plays at the highest level of Dutch basketball.

Season by season

Notable players

 Ian Hanavan (2003–2004)
 Rogier Jansen (2005–2006)
 John Turek (2005–2006)

Head coaches

References

External links
Official website (Dutch)
Eurobasket profile

Basketball teams in the Netherlands
Sports clubs in Almere
Former Dutch Basketball League teams
Basketball teams established in 1999
1999 establishments in the Netherlands